Prototype Festival is an annual, weeklong contemporary opera and musical theater festival held in New York City.

Program 

Prototype Festival is an annual, weeklong festival of contemporary opera and musical theater. The festival encourages nontraditional operatic compositions and performance, or "black-box opera", combining classical techniques with experimental theater. Prototype has a reputation for showing "brash, socially engaged, and substantially post-classical" work—shows with highly charged, "dark, edgy" themes.

Its shows are held in venues across New York City, including venues such as the HERE Arts Center, La MaMa Experimental Theatre Club, Joe's Pub, St. Paul's Chapel, the Park Avenue Armory, St. Ann's Warehouse, National Sawdust, and Skirball Center for the Performing Arts.

Organization 

The first Prototype Festival was organized by alternative opera producer Beth Morrison and the HERE Arts Center's Kristin Marting and Kim Whitener in 2013. Their intent was to highlight composers whose nontraditional work rarely received commissions.

Reception 

The festival has a reputation for producing new operas of high quality. While classical music institutions struggled to sell new work to its core audience, classical music critic Anne Midgette cited Prototype as developing an audience for opera outside of these institutions and evolving the form into less of a "bourgeois art form". Prototype rose to prominence quickly, Midgette wrote, from a confluence of the opera world's "desperation" to find new, good work and the reduced costs of staging an experimental show outside of major mainstages. Without remaking the genre, she wrote that Prototype provides the creativity and energy to attempt new works.

The New Yorker wrote that Prototype's 11-day 2014 lineup produced more substance for the format than a decade of the New York City Opera. The magazine noted the festival's equal time given to female artists as deviant from New York theater norms.

World premieres 

As of 2019, Prototype's headlining shows tended to premiere outside of the festival.

References

Further reading

External links 

 

Opera festivals
Opera in New York City